Axion estin (Greek: , Slavonic: Достóйно éсть, Dostóino yesť), or It is Truly Meet, is a megalynarion and a theotokion, i.e. a magnification of and a Hymn to Mary used in the Divine Services of the Eastern Orthodox and Byzantine Catholic churches. It consists of a troparion and a sticheron composed in honor of the Theotokos (i.e. the Virgin Mary).

Axion estin is also the name of type of icon of the Theotokos, also known as the Eleousa type, after the icon of Karyes (Mount Athos) in front of which, according to tradition, the hymn was revealed in the late 10th century. At Karyes, the icon is currently kept in the Protaton.

Text 

The second half of the hymn, beginning with the words, "More honorable than the cherubim..." is the older part of the hymn, and is an Irmos attributed to St. Cosmas the Hymnographer (d. 773). 
The introduction, "It is truly meet..." was, according to tradition, revealed by the Archangel Gabriel to a monk on Mount Athos, in the late 10th century.

Liturgical use 

The hymn is chanted at Matins, Compline, and other services; but its most important occurrence is at the Divine Liturgy, where it is chanted at the conclusion of the Anaphora. The second half of the hymn, "More honorable…" is frequently chanted before the dismissal which concludes services.

Often, the chanting of this hymn is followed by either a metania or a prostration.

Liturgical translations

The hymn In Church Slavonic is:

Досто́йно єсть я́кѡ вои́стину блажи́ти Тѧ,Богоро́дицу, Присноблажєнную и Прєнєпоро́чную, и Ма́тєрь Бо́га на́шєгѡ.Чєстнѣйшую Хєрувіми сла́внѣйшую бєзъ сравнєнїѧ Сєрафім,бєзъ истлѣнїѧ Бо́га Сло́ва ро́ждшую,су́щую Богоро́дицу Тѧ вєлича́ємъ.

Dostoyno yest’ yako voistinu blazhiti Tya,Bohoroditsu, Prisnoblazhennuyu i Preneporochnuyu, i Mater’ Boha nasheho.Chestniyshuyu Kheruvimi slavniyshuyu bez sravneniya Serafim,bez istliniya Boha Slova rozhdshuyu,sushchuyu Bohoroditsu Tya velichaem.

The hymn in Romanian is:

 Cuvine-se cu adevărat să te fericim Născătoare de Dumnezeu,  cea pururea fericită și preanevinovată și maica Dumnezeului nostru. Ceea ce ești  mai cinstită decât Heruvimii  și mai mărită fără de asemănare decât Serafimii.  Care fără stricăciune, pe Dumnezeu Cuvântul ai născut.  Pe tine cea cu adevărat Născătoare de Dumnezeu, te mărim.

Hymns in place of the Axion Estin 

During the Divine Liturgy, Axion Estin is sometimes replaced by another hymn to the Theotokos. These hymns are referred to in the service books as "in place of Axion Estin" (Slavonic: Задосто́йник, Zadostoynik), or by the term "eis to Exairetos", meaning "at the Especially (petition)," from the petition that precedes them calling "especially" for the intercessions of the Theotokos.

At the Liturgy of St. Basil, it has since the 14th century been replaced by the hymn:

In Greek:

Translation thereof:

All of Creation rejoices in thee, O full of grace:the angels in heaven and the race of men,O sanctified temple and spiritual paradise,the glory of virgins, of whom God was incarnateand became a child, our God before the ages.He made thy body into a throne,and thy womb more spacious than the heavens.All of creation rejoices in thee, O full of grace:Glory be to thee.

On the Great Feasts, it is replaced by the Irmos of the ninth Ode of the Canon of the Feast.

During Paschaltide (Pentecostarion) Axion estin is replaced in Anaphora by The Angel Cried-hymn:

In Greek:

Translation:
The angel cried to the Lady Full of Grace:Rejoice, O Pure Virgin! Again I say: Rejoice!Your Son is risen from His three days in the tomb!With Himself He has raised all the dead!Rejoice, all you people!
Shine! Shine! O New Jerusalem!The Glory of the Lord has shone on you!Exalt now and be glad, O Zion!Be radiant, O Pure Theotokos,in the Resurrection of your Son!

Icon 
Axion Estin is also the name given to the icon of the Theotokos (Mother of God) before which, according to tradition, the hymn was revealed. It stands in the high place of the altar (sanctuary) of the katholikon (main church) of Karyes on Mount Athos.

According to tradition, an Elder and his disciple lived in a cell on Mount Athos. One Saturday night the Elder left to attend the All-Night Vigil in Karyes. He told his disciple to chant the service alone. That evening an unknown monk who called himself Gabriel, came to the cell, and they began the Vigil together. During the Ninth Ode of the Canon, when they began to sing the Magnificat, the disciple sang the original hymn "More honorable than the Cherubim…" and afterwards the visiting monk chanted it again, but with "It is truly meet…" preceding the original Irmos.  As he sang, the icon began to radiate with Uncreated Light. When the disciple asked the visiting monk to write the words of the new hymn down, he took a roof tile and wrote on it with his finger, as though the tile were made of wax. The disciple knew then that this was no ordinary monk, but the Archangel Gabriel. At that moment the Archangel disappeared, but the icon of the Mother of God continued to radiate light for some time afterward.

The Eleousa ("merciful") Icon of the Mother of God, before which the hymn "It Is Truly Meet" was first chanted, was transferred to the katholikon (main church) at Karyes, known as the Protaton. The tile, with the hymn written on it, was taken to Constantinople when St. Nicholas II Chrysoberges was Patriarch (984-996).

Since that time the icon has been considered the protector of the Holy Mountain and its holiest object.

Feast Day 
The feast day celebrating the revelation of the hymn by the Archangel Gabriel, and the Icon of the Theotokos of the same name, is celebrated on June 13.

See also 
 Axion Esti Encomium
 Agni Parthene
 Hymns to Mary
 Ye Watchers and Ye Holy Ones
 Odysseas Elytis

References

External links 
 The Official site of the Holy Cell Axion Estin, on Mt. Athos
 The Revelation of Axion Estin
 It is Truly Meet the Synaxarion of the feast (note: the icon depicted here is not "Axion Estin")
 Miraculous Icon of Axion Esti

Genres of Byzantine music
Eastern Christian liturgy
Catholic liturgy
Liturgy of the Hours
Eastern Orthodox icons of the Virgin Mary
Marian hymns
Mount Athos